is a Japanese football player. He is currently contracted to Gamba Osaka in J1 League. His regular paying position is central midfielder.

Club career

Born and raised in Osaka, Ichimaru came through the youth ranks at Gamba Osaka and earned his first professional contract ahead of the 2016 season.   He didn't see any game time for Gamba's first team in J1 League, however he made 21 appearances for Gamba Osaka in J3 League to help them to a 9th place finish in the final table.

2017 saw him make his J1 debut in a 2-0 home defeat to Júbilo Iwata on 13 August 2017.   He started the match in central midfield and was subbed by Shun Nagasawa after 76 minutes.   That was to be his only league appearance that year and coupled with 3 matches in the cups, he played a total of 4 games in 2017.

In 2018 he started the first four matches of the season under new head coach Levir Culpi before injury forced him to take a spell on the sidelines and he was unable to regain his place under new manager Tsuneyasu Miyamoto, who replaced Culpi halfway through the year.   He found himself spending most of the rest of 2018 playing once again for Gamba U-23 in J3 where he made 20 appearances to help them to 6th in the final standings.

National team career

In May 2017, Ichimaru was elected Japan U-20 national team for 2017 U-20 World Cup. At this tournament, he played 3 matches as defensive midfielder.

Club statistics

Last update: 1 May 2019

Reserves performance

References

External links

1997 births
Living people
Association football people from Osaka Prefecture
Japanese footballers
Japan youth international footballers
J1 League players
J2 League players
J3 League players
Gamba Osaka players
Gamba Osaka U-23 players
FC Gifu players
FC Ryukyu players
Association football midfielders
People from Ibaraki, Osaka